Judah and 28th Avenue is a light rail stop on the Muni Metro N Judah line, located in the Sunset District neighborhood of San Francisco, California. The stop opened with the N Judah line on October 21, 1928. The station has two side platforms in the middle of Judah Street (traffic islands) where passengers board or depart from trains. The station also has mini-high platforms providing access to people with disabilities.

Platform construction 

In March 2014, Muni released details of the proposed implementation of their Transit Effectiveness Project (later rebranded MuniForward). A variety of stop changes were proposed for the N Judah line, including extensions of the existing boarding islands at 28th Avenue.

Two subprojects – 28th Avenue, and Irving Street between 9th Avenue and Arguello – were selected for early implementation in coordination with rail replacement and seismic refitting of the Sunset Tunnel. 28th Avenue was prioritized for construction of handicapped accessible platforms to halve the 17-block, 1-mile gap between existing accessible stops at Judah and Sunset and Judah and 19th Avenue. Muni began construction of the eastbound platform on November 10, 2014. The eastbound platform was placed in service on February 6, 2015, followed by the westbound platform on March 31.

References

External links 

SFMTA – Judah and 28th Avenue inbound and outbound
SFBay Transit (unofficial) – Judah St & 28th Ave

Muni Metro stations
Sunset District, San Francisco